Šorm is a Czech surname. Notable people with the name include:

 František Šorm (1913–1980), Czech chemist known for synthesis of natural compounds
 Josef Šorm (born 1932), Czech volleyball player
 Patrik Šorm (born 1993), Czech sprinter specialising in the 400 metres

See also
 3993 Šorm, a main-belt asteroid named after František Šorm
 SORM

Czech-language surnames